Prabhakar Rao (4 August 1935 – 9 June 2019) was an Indian cricketer. He played in 32 first-class matches for Madras from 1956/57 to 1966/67. Following his cricket career, he became the vice-president of the Tamil Nadu Cricket Association.

See also
 List of Tamil Nadu cricketers

References

External links
 

1935 births
2019 deaths
Indian cricketers
Tamil Nadu cricketers
Cricketers from Chennai